Karl-Heinz Streibich (born 1952) is a German manager who served as chairman of the executive board and chief executive officer of the Germany-based software company Software AG from 2003 until 2018. Prior to that he was deputy chairman and deputy chief executive officer of T-Systems

Early life and education
Streibich was born in Germany. He holds a degree in communications engineering from the Offenburg University, Germany.

Career
Streibich started his career in 1981 at Dow Chemical Company in Rheinmünster, Germany, as a software development engineer. Three years later he joined ITT Industries as product marketing manager then moved to ITT-SEL AG now Alcatel-Lucent as managing director of the PC business. He joined Daimler Benz AG in 1989, where he served several IT-related executive positions before serving as deputy chairman and deputy chief executive officer of Debis Systemhaus facilitating the merger with T-Systems between 2000 and 2002. He is a member of the supervisory board (Aufsichtsrat) at Deutsche Messe AG, and holds several honorary positions, including member of the presidency of the German IT Association BITKOM, co-chairman of the platform “Digital administration and public IT“ within the framework of the German Chancellor's IT summit, and he is a co-founder of the German Software Cluster of Excellence.

From 2003 until 2018 Streibich served as chairman of the executive board and chief executive officer of the Germany-based software company Software AG. In this capacity, he was also responsible for the company's corporate marketing, audit, processes & quality, legal affairs, and corporate communications. Under his leadership, Software AG acquired webMethods for $546 million in cash to add networking software to its product line.

Streibich is the author of the book entitled The Digital Enterprise, published in 2014.

Other activities

Corporate boards 
 Software AG, Member of the Supervisory Board (since 2020)
 Munich Re, Member of the Supervisory Board (since 2019)
 Siemens Healthineers, Member of the Supervisory Board (since 2018)
 Dürr AG, Member of the Supervisory Board (2011-2020), Chairman of the Supervisory Board (2018-2020)
 Wittenstein, Member of the Supervisory Board (2017-2019)
 Deutsche Messe, Member of the Supervisory Board (2013-2017)

Non-profit organizations 
 German Cancer Research Center (DKFZ), Member of the Advisory Council
 Senckenberg Nature Research Society, Member of the Board of Trustees

References

1952 births
Living people
Businesspeople from Hesse
Software AG